L'onorata società is a 1961 Italian comedy film written and directed by Riccardo Pazzaglia. It was shown as part of a retrospective on Italian comedy at the 67th Venice International Film Festival.

Cast
 Franco Franchi as Salvatore
 Ciccio Ingrassia as Rosolino
 Domenico Modugno as Salvatore, the husband
 Rosanna Schiaffino as Rosaria, the wife
 Vittorio De Sica as Salvatore, the 'Capintesta'
 Didi Perego as Owner of 'Piccola Sicilia'
 Tiberio Murgia as Salvatore Trezza
 Marisa Belli as Rosetta Zappalà
 Gino Buzzanca as Salvatore Zappalà

References

External links

1961 films
1961 comedy films
1960s buddy comedy films
1960s Italian-language films
Italian black-and-white films
Films set in Sicily
Films set in Rome
Italian buddy comedy films
1960s Italian films